Markus Windisch (born 12 May 1984) is a former Italian biathlete.

Career
Windisch had three top-10 finishes in World Cup races, with his best World Cup overall finish was 26th in the 2008–09 Biathlon World Cup. He represented Italy at the 2010 Winter Olympics and 2014 Winter Olympics. His brother Dominik Windisch is also a biathlete.

He retired from the sport after the 2013–14 season.

Biathlon results
All results are sourced from the International Biathlon Union.

Olympic Games

*The mixed relay was added as an event in 2014.

World Championships

*During Olympic seasons competitions are only held for those events not included in the Olympic program.

Junior/Youth World Championships

Further notable results
 2007: 2nd, Italian championships of biathlon, mass start
 2008: 2nd, Italian championships of biathlon, mass start
 2009:
 1st, Italian championships of biathlon, sprint
 2nd, Italian championships of biathlon, pursuit
 2010:
 2nd, Italian championships of biathlon, sprint
 2nd, Italian championships of biathlon, pursuit
 2011: 3rd, Italian championships of biathlon, sprint

References

External links
 

1984 births
Living people
Sportspeople from Bruneck
Germanophone Italian people
Biathletes of Gruppo Sportivo Esercito
Italian male biathletes
Biathletes at the 2010 Winter Olympics
Biathletes at the 2014 Winter Olympics
Olympic biathletes of Italy